Sinan is a given name and surname.

Sinan may also refer to:

Buildings, institutions and places
 Sinan, Iran, a village in North Khorasan Province, Iran
 Mosque Katip Sinan Qelebi, in Prizren, Kosovo
 Sinan Pasha Mosque (Damascus), an early Ottoman-era mosque in Damascus, Syria, located along Suq Sinaniyya Street
 Sinan Pasha Mosque (Istanbul), built by one Sinan for another
 Sinan Pasha Mosque (Kaçanik), Kosovo
 Sinan Pasha Mosque (Prizren), Kosovo
 Mimar Sinan Fine Arts University, Istanbul
 Sinan Erdem Dome, Istanbul
 Abu Sinan, local council in Israel
 Sinan, Yemen, village in San‘a’ Governorate
 Kalaat es Senam, town in Tunisia
 Sinan (crater), crater on Mercury (named after Mimar Sinan)
 Sinanjiang Dam in Yunnan, China

Places 
 Sinan (woreda), Ethiopia
 Ain Sinan, Qatar
 Sinan County, Guizhou (思南县), China
 Sinan County, South Jeolla (신안군 / 新安郡), South Korea
 Tell Sinan, Syria

Other uses
 Hakan Karahan (born 1960), Turkish writer who uses pseudonym Sinan

See also
 Sinan County (disambiguation)
 Sinan Pasha Mosque (disambiguation)
 Sinon, warrior in Greek mythology who was involved in the Trojan Wars